Dustin Clare is an Australian actor. He is known for his starring role as Gannicus in the Starz series Spartacus: Gods of the Arena, Spartacus: Vengeance and Spartacus: War of the Damned, and as Riley Ward on the series McLeod's Daughters.

Personal life
Clare is from Australia. Born in Grafton, he grew up in both  Ballina, NSW and Maclean, NSW. Clare studied at the Western Australian Academy of Performing Arts in Perth, he graduated in 2004.

He served as a 2012 ambassador for the Warrambeen Film Festival. He is also an ambassador for the White Ribbon Foundation.

Career
From 2006–2007, he starred as Riley Ward in 48 episodes of the series McLeod's Daughters. In 2009, he played Sydney hit-man and gangland figure Christopher Dale Flannery in Underbelly: A Tale of Two Cities and also as Sean in the Showtime Network (Australia) series Satisfaction.

His global fame occurred when he starred as Gannicus, the champion gladiator of the House of Batiatus, in Spartacus: Gods of the Arena. This is the prequel to the series Spartacus: Blood and Sand and the second season chronologically of release. He returned to his role as Gannicus in the two sequel seasons to Spartacus: Blood and Sand entitled Spartacus: Vengeance and Spartacus: War of the Damned.

He received a Logie Award for McLeods Daughters, and an Equity Ensemble award for ANZAC Girls.

Filmography

References

External links 
 

1982 births
21st-century Australian male actors
Australian male film actors
Australian male television actors
Australian people of New Zealand descent
Living people
Logie Award winners

People from Grafton, New South Wales